Echoes of Love may refer to:

"Echoes of Love", a 1964 song by Elvis Presley in Kissin' Cousins
"Echoes of Love" (The Doobie Brothers song), 1977
Echoes of Love, a 2010 book by Rosie Rushton
Echoes of Love, a 2012 music album by Omar Akram which won a Grammy Award for Best New Age Albu
"Echoes of Love", a 2016 song and 2017 extended play by Jesse & Joy

See also
Echo of Love, a 2012 album by An Epic No Less